Paul Smith (26 March 1820 – 1???) was an English cricketer. Smith's batting and bowling styles are unknown.

Born at Sheffield, Yorkshire, Smith made his first-class debut for Sheffield against Manchester in 1846 at Hyde Ground Park, Sheffield. He made a second first-class fixture in that season in the return fixture between the sides at Moss Lane, Manchester. In his two first-class matches, he scored a total of 68 runs at an average of 17.00, with a high score of 40. With the ball, he took 6 wickets, all of which came in a single innings during the match at Manchester. Outside of playing first-class matches for Sheffield, Smith was also active in club cricket in Newcastle and County Durham. He was a pub landlord, including at the Bath Inn in Newcastle, which was the home of the Northumberland Club which he played cricket for.

His brother John also played first-class cricket.

References

External list
Paul Smith at ESPNcricinfo

1820 births
Year of death missing
Cricketers from Sheffield
English cricketers
Sheffield Cricket Club cricketers
English cricketers of 1826 to 1863